Devon station is a commuter rail station located in the western suburbs of Philadelphia at 98 North Devon Boulevard and Lancaster Avenue in Devon, Pennsylvania, United States. It is served by most Paoli/Thorndale Line trains.

Devon station was originally built by the Pennsylvania Railroad and opened in 1883. The architect, W. Bleddyn Powell, designed the building to match the English aesthetic established by Devon developers Coffin & Altemus, who contributed toward the station's construction. Replacing an older station a short distance to the east built just a year before, the station was positioned to be in alignment with the first Devon Inn built in 1882. 

The old baggage shelter was demolished in 2004. The station building was repainted in 2005.

The ticket office at this station is open weekdays from 5:50 a.m. to 1:15 p.m. excluding holidays. There are 166 parking spaces available for daily parking at the station.

This station is 16.4 track miles from Philadelphia's Suburban Station. In 2017, the average total weekday boardings at this station was 455, and the average total weekday alightings was 364.

Station layout
Devon has two low-level side platforms with pathways connecting the platforms to the inner tracks.

References

External links

 SEPTA – Devon Station
 Station House from Google Maps Street View

SEPTA Regional Rail stations
Former Pennsylvania Railroad stations
Philadelphia to Harrisburg Main Line
Railway stations in Chester County, Pennsylvania
Railway stations in the United States opened in 1890